Baixo Alentejo was a Portuguese province. It was abolished with the Constitution of 1976.

Districts
 Beja District
 Setúbal District (southern half)

Subregions 
The area is equal to the area covered by Baixo Alentejo Subregion and Alentejo Litoral Subregion.

Municipalities

External links

Alentejo
Provinces of Portugal (1936–1976)
1936 establishments in Portugal
1976 disestablishments in Portugal